Sweden held a general election around 17 September 1932.

Results

The Clerical People's Party, albeit a separate party, received 8,911 votes or 0.4% of the vote share, but had the votes reassigned to the General Electoral League as a result of them forfeiting their votes out of tactical purposes and were listed as Electoral League or "Rightist" votes in the official final results. No Clerical People's Party member got elected to the Riksdag, which meant the Electoral League covered the entire rightist delegation. Therefore, the General Electoral League may correctly be attributed to both 23.1% and 23.5% of the overall vote share.

Constituency results

Percentage share

By votes

Results by city and district

Blekinge

Gothenburg and Bohuslän

Bohuslän

Gothenburg

Gotland

Gävleborg

Halland
The two liberal parties, the Free-minded National Association and the Liberal Party ran on a joint list, with their separate results only reported in the national count.

Jämtland

Jönköping

Kalmar

Kopparberg

Kristianstad

Kronoberg

Malmöhus

Malmö area
The two liberal parties, the Free-minded National Association and the Liberal Party ran on a joint list and their respective results were only reported at an overall summary level.

Malmöhus County

Norrbotten

Skaraborg

Stockholm

Stockholm (city)

Stockholm County

Södermanland

Uppsala
The two liberal parties, the Free-minded National Association and the Liberal Party ran on a joint list, although their respective totals were reported separately in the national results.

Värmland
The two liberal parties, the Free-minded National Association and the Liberal Party ran on a joint list, with their separate results only being reported in the nationwide tallies for the constituency.

Västerbotten

Västernorrland

Västmanland

Älvsborg

Älvsborg N

Älvsborg S

Örebro

Östergötland

References

General elections in Sweden